El Mirage Field is a private airport located 3 miles west of El Mirage, California.  It is leased by General Atomics of San Diego.  Its primary use is the development and testing of unmanned aerial vehicles (UAV) for the United States military and US Government.

El Mirage Field, has a sister site located at Grey Butte Field Airport.

History 

During World War II, the airport was designated as Mirage Auxiliary Airfield (No 3), and was an auxiliary training airfield for Victorville Army Airfield, California.

The wartime runways are abandoned and now used by General Atomics for their UAV testing.

See also

 California World War II Army Airfields

References 

  Abandoned & Little-Known Airfields: California - Southern Palmdale area

External links 

Airports in San Bernardino County, California